Ataxia spinipennis is a species of beetle in the family Cerambycidae. It was described by Chevrolat in 1862. It is known from Puerto Rico and Cuba.

References

Ataxia (beetle)
Beetles described in 1862